"Girls Make Me Sick" is the debut single by Butcher Boy, released on HDIF Records in 2007. It received a rating of 9/10 when reviewed by Drowned In Sound, who described it as "a triumphantly bitter and sad slice of whimsy, custom-built for the fey kids down the disco in 1996 and just danceable enough to make it appropriate in this decade".

Track listing
"Girls Make Me Sick"
"Permanent Past Tense"
"Arbor Day"

References

2007 singles
2006 songs